The Federal Fiscal Court (abbreviated ) is one of five federal supreme courts of Germany, established according to Article 95 of the Basic Law. It is the federal court of appeal for tax and customs matters in cases which have already been heard by the subordinate instance, namely the Fiscal Courts.

The court has its seat in Munich.

List of presidents of the Federal Fiscal Court

Gallery

References

Bibliography

External links
 
 
 Information in English from the Federal Fiscal Court

Germany 
Administrative courts
Courts in Germany
Organisations based in Munich
Public finance of Germany
Tax courts
1950 establishments in West Germany
Courts and tribunals established in 1950